Third Street Historic District may refer to:

Third Street Historic District (Milton, Kentucky), listed on the National Register of Historic Places in Trimble County, Kentucky
Third Street Historic District (Pikeville, Kentucky), listed on the National Register of Historic Places in Pike County, Kentucky
North Third Street Historic District (Louisiana, Missouri), listed on the National Register of Historic Places in Pike County, Missouri
North Third Street Historic District (Milwaukee, Wisconsin), listed on the National Register of Historic Places in Milwaukee County, Wisconsin
Old World Third Street Historic District, listed on the National Register of Historic Places in Milwaukee County, Wisconsin
South Third Street Historic District (Chipley, Florida), listed on the National Register of Historic Places in Washington County, Florida
South Third Street Historic District (Lafayette, Indiana)
West Third Street Historic District (Davenport, Iowa), listed on the National Register of Historic Places in Scott County, Iowa
West Third Street Historic District (Dayton, Ohio), listed on the National Register of Historic Places in Montgomery County, Ohio
East Third Street Residential Historic District, listed on the National Register of Historic Places in Bayfield County, Wisconsin